This article summarizes the outcomes of all official matches played by the Palestine national football team by opponent and by period, since they first played in official competitions in 1953.

Results in chronological order

1953–1997

1998–2009

2010–2019 

105 matches played:

2020–present 

4 matches played:

See also
Palestine national football team records and statistics

Notes

References

External links
FIFA.com
World Football Elo Ratings: Palestine
Wildstat